John Stephen Parrott,  (born 11 May 1964) is an English former professional snooker player and television personality. He was a familiar face on the professional snooker circuit during the late 1980s and throughout the 1990s, and remained within the top 16 of the world rankings for fourteen consecutive seasons.

He reached the final of the 1989 World Championship, where he lost 3–18 to Steve Davis, the heaviest defeat in a world championship final in modern times. He won the title two years later, defeating Jimmy White in the final of the 1991 World Championship. He repeated his win against White later the same year, to take the 1991 UK Championship title, becoming only the third player to win both championships in the same calendar year (after Steve Davis and Stephen Hendry); he is still one of only six players to have achieved this feat. He spent three seasons at number 2 in the world rankings (1989–90, 1992–93, 1993–94), and he is one of several players to have achieved more than 200 competitive centuries during his career, with 221.

Early career
Parrott was a keen bowls player until the age of 12, but then discovered snooker, and has been a dedicated player ever since. He was successful from an early age; when he was 15, his talent was spotted by Phil Miller, who became his long-term manager in 1980. He lost in the final of the English Under-16s Championship in 1980, but won the 1981 Pontins Junior Championship. In 1982, he was Pontins Open Champion and Junior Pot Black Champion, after narrowly defeating Mark "Lightning" Lockwood. He turned professional the following year after winning a record 14 tournaments in his last year as an amateur player.

Professional career
Parrott turned professional in 1983 and he made his televised debut as a professional during the 1984 Classic in which he played Alex Higgins in the last 16 of the competition in front of a packed house at Warrington near his hometown of Liverpool. He caused a stir by winning the match 5–2. He then beat Tony Knowles in the next round before losing to Steve Davis in the semi-finals. By then, bookmakers had him tipped to be the World Snooker Champion within five years (it took him seven years). He took his first ranking title in the 1989 European Open, and defended his title in 1990.

Parrott spent 14 consecutive seasons in the top 16 of the snooker world rankings, 11 of them in the top 6.

From 1984 to 2004 Parrott was ever-present at the World Championship, reaching at least the last 16 every year from 1984 to 1995, but he failed to qualify in 2005.

Following his 1991 victory he never again reached the semi-finals, but lost in the quarter-finals seven times between 1992 and 1999.

Overall, Parrott won a total of nine world ranking events, which as of November 2019 was 12th on the all-time list behind Stephen Hendry, Steve Davis, Ronnie O'Sullivan, John Higgins, Mark Williams, Jimmy White, Mark Selby, Ding Junhui, Neil Robertson, Peter Ebdon and Judd Trump. Winning both the World Championship and UK Championship in 1991 made him one of only six players to have won snooker's two most prominent ranking titles in the same year.

Parrott also reached the final of the Masters three times in four years, but lost to Stephen Hendry on each occasion.

Parrott came through the qualifying event for the World Championship a record ten times. In 2007 he reached the last 16 of the World Championship for the first time in seven years, after victories over James Leadbetter, David Gray and Steve Davis (10–9, having led 6–1 and 9–6).

A record ten of Parrott's World Championship matches went to a final-frame decider, seven of which he won. He was also the first player to conduct a "whitewash" in the Crucible World Championship final stages, when he defeated Eddie Charlton 10–0 in the first round of the 1992 tournament. For 27 years, he held the record for being the only player ever to achieve this, until Shaun Murphy defeated China's Luo Honghao 10–0 in the first round of the 2019 World Championship.

On 4 August 2009 at the qualifiers for the 2009 Shanghai Masters he lost 0–5 against Michael White.

Following his 6–10 defeat to young Chinese Zhang Anda in the 2010 World Championship Qualifiers, Parrott finished outside the top 64 in the end of season rankings and was not assured a place on the main tour for the 2010–11 season. Later Parrott announced he was to retire from the professional game.

Parrott did however participate in the preliminary qualifying rounds of the 2012 World Snooker Championship, losing 0–5 to Patrick Wallace in Round 1.

Television work

Parrott is a studio expert on snooker for BBC Sport, often in partnership with Steve Davis; he also delivers many of their playing tutorials and provides guidance for the viewers. From 1996 to 2002, he was one of the team captains on A Question of Sport, alongside footballer and pundit Ally McCoist.

He is also a follower of horse racing and has been involved in the BBC's horse racing coverage as part of the presenting team.

Personal life
Parrott is an Everton supporter. He is the brother-in-law of former Everton player Duncan Ferguson.

In 1996, Parrott was honoured with an MBE in the Queen's Birthday Honours list, for charitable services in Merseyside.

In 2008, he launched John Parrott Cue Sports, an online retailer selling snooker and pool cues and some snooker collectables. This was re-branded John Parrott Sports in 2019.

In 2010, it was announced that Parrott was to be the Honorary Patron of the British Crown Green Bowling Association (BCGBA).

Performance and rankings timeline

Career finals

Ranking finals: 18 (9 titles)

Non-ranking finals: 22 (7 titles)

Team finals: 1 (1 title)

Pro-am finals: 3 (2 titles)

Amateur finals: 8 (3 titles)

Notes

References

Further reading

External links

 

Members of the Order of the British Empire
1964 births
Living people
British sports broadcasters
Snooker players from Liverpool
Snooker writers and broadcasters
BBC sports presenters and reporters
UK champions (snooker)
Winners of the professional snooker world championship
English snooker players